The Knoxville Fire Department is an ISO Class 2 department that provides fire protection and emergency medical services for the city of Knoxville, Tennessee.

History
The Knoxville Fire Department can trace its beginnings to 1854 when Town Marshal J.D. Stacks saw the need for an organized volunteer fire department. But it was in March 1885 when the city of Knoxville formed a full-time, paid fire department. By the turn of the century, the number of firefighters in the department had grown to 30. With the increase in personnel came the need for more fire stations and better equipment. In the last 100 years, the Knoxville Fire Department has grown from the Headquarters station in an old livery stable building with two horse drawn engine companies and one aerial truck company to 19 fire stations, out of which 13 fire engines, 3 squads, 3 quints, 5 ladder trucks, 2 rescue units, and 1 hazmat company operate, along with 5 tankers, 1 fire rescue boat and other specialty equipment. These companies and units are under the command of 4 Battalions, each commanded by a Battalion Chief. The International Association of Firefighters (IAFF) Local is 65.

Historic Station

The departments Fire Station Number 5 is the oldest active fire station in Knoxville and is on the National Register of Historic Places. Opened on May 23, 1909, it has served the Mechanicsville community of Knoxville almost continuously since. The fire station was the last in Knoxville to be built specifically for horse-drawn fire apparatus. Located at 419 Arthur Street in Mechanicsville, just northwest of the downtown area the station was added on the National Register of Historic Places in 1978.

Stations and apparatus

Notable Incidents

Million Dollar Fire

Early on the morning of April 8, 1897, a fire engulfed two blocks of Gay Street from Commerce Avenue to Union Avenue in downtown Knoxville. The massive blaze required all the resources of KFD (listed at the time as two steam engines), as well as firefighters and equipment from as far away as Chattanooga to extinguish.

By the end of the blaze, five people had perished and losses were estimated at more than a million dollars (approximately $ adjusted for inflation). The fire department resorted to using dynamite to stop the spread of the fire to other nearby buildings.

McClung Warehouse Fires
On February 7, 2007, the former McClung Warehouses in the 500 block of Jackson Avenue burned. Heavy damage was sustained to several buildings in the area. During the three alarm fire, several building collapses occurred, one of which heavily damaged Ladder 3. Additionally, four firefighters were injured when they were trapped upstairs in the burning building and had to make a hasty escape through a window using a fire hose as a makeshift rope ladder. The warehouses, some of which dated back to 1893, were mostly vacant at the time of the fire.

Another portion of the McClung Warehouse building was destroyed by fire in the early morning hours of February 1, 2014. This occurred less than a year after the City of Knoxville purchased the remaining warehouses with plans of encouraging developers to utilize them in urban renewal projects. Shortly after the two alarm blaze, city officials demolished another portion of the derelict structure.

References

Knoxville
Fire